Kyung-hee Hong (born November 18, 1954) is a South Korean sculptor. Born in Seoul, she holds an MFA degree in metal craft and teaches at the College of Fine Art and Design of Hongik University in Seoul, South Korea. Her sculpture was included in the exhibit One of a Kind: The Studio Craft Movement at the Metropolitan Museum of Art in New York City from December 22, 2006, to September 3, 2007.

References

1954 births
Living people
Artists from Seoul
Academic staff of Hongik University
Modern sculptors
South Korean artists
South Korean sculptors
South Korean women artists